The Marceau class was group of three of ironclad barbette ships of the French Navy built in the 1880s and early 1890s. The ships were based on the earlier  of barbette ships, but with smaller guns: four  weapons compared to the three  guns of the earlier vessels. They introduced the lozenge arrangement for their main battery that became common for many French capital ships built in the 1890s. Continuous tinkering with the Marceau design during their long construction produced badly flawed vessels that were superseded by more powerful pre-dreadnought battleships almost immediately after the French commissioned them in the early 1890s.

The three ships served in the Mediterranean Squadron in the 1890s and saw little activity beyond routine training exercises. They were quickly reduced to the Reserve Division of the squadron as the French commissioned their own pre-dreadnoughts. All three Marceaus were modernized in the early 1900s, receiving new water-tube boilers and having their top-heavy superstructures and masts cut down, but they saw little activity afterward. Marceau and Magenta were used as training ships, while Neptune saw no further use. The latter two vessels were discarded between 1908 and 1913, while Marceau lingered on as a floating workshop. She was used in that role during World War I. She was sold to ship breakers in 1921, but was wrecked while being towed off Bizerte and could not be re-floated.

Design

In the aftermath of the Franco-Prussian War of 1870–1871, the French Navy embarked on a construction program to strengthen the fleet in 1872. The French initially viewed the ships as not worthy of concern, though by 1877, public pressure over the new Italian vessels prompted the Navy's  (Board of Construction) to design a response, beginning with the barbette ship  and following with six vessels carrying 100-ton guns of French design. The first of these were the two s, which carried their guns in open barbettes, all on the centerline, with one forward and two aft.

Problems aboard other vessels with new 76-ton guns prompted the naval command to abandon the as-yet untested 100-ton weapons. A modified version of the 76-ton gun with a longer barrel and that had been adapted to use new propellant charges was developed; these changes gave it higher muzzle velocity, which allowed its shells to penetrate as well as the 100-ton gun had been expected to perform. The Amiral Baudins were too advanced in their construction to allow their design to be revised, but the other four vessels of the program, which became  and the three Marceau-class ironclads, had not yet begun building. Their design, which was prepared by the naval engineer Charles Ernest Huin, was radically altered from the Amiral Baudin arrangement to what would become the standard for future French capital ships for the next two decades. The large caliber guns were increased to four, one forward, one aft, and a wing mount on either side amidships to maximize end-on fire (which was emphasized by those who favored ramming attacks).

By the time the design for these new ships was being finalized in early 1880, very large guns had fallen out of favor in the French Navy, so new 52-ton guns were substituted. The Navy had intended to build all four vessels to the same design, but after work began on the first vessel in June 1880, the shipyard realized that Huin's design, which had been modified dozens of times by different elements in the French naval command, was unworkable. The proposed hull dimensions were insufficient for the weight of armament to be carried. The shipyard engineers proposed widening the beam and increasing displacement to correct the problem, but Hoche was too far advanced in construction to allow the necessary changes without breaking up the existing hull structure. The other three ships, which became the Marceaus, had not been laid down and could be modified, and they retained the barbettes of the earlier ships.

Characteristics and machinery

They displaced . As was customary for French capital ships of the era, their hull featured a pronounced tumblehome shape and incorporated a ram bow. Marceau was completed with a comparatively light superstructure, but Neptune and Magenta received very large structures that contributed to poor stability. The ships' hulls were divided into watertight compartments by thirteen transverse bulkheads and seventeen longitudinal bulkheads. A double bottom further improved the ships' resistance to damage below the waterline. The hulls were constructed with iron, but their superstructures were largely composed of steel to save weight.

Steering was controlled from a small conning tower directly aft of the forward main battery gun. Marceau was fitted with a pair of pole masts equipped with fighting tops that carried some of her light guns and spotted for her main battery. Magenta had a heavy military mast in place of her forward pole mast, and both of Neptunes masts were of the heavy variety. Their crews ranged from 643 to 651 officers and enlisted men.

Marceaus propulsion machinery consisted of a pair of compound steam engines that each drove a screw propeller, while Magenta and Neptune had four such engines driving a pair of shafts. Steam was provided by eight coal-burning fire-tube boilers aboard Marceau and Magenta, but Neptune was fitted with twelve of the boilers. In the early 1900s, the ships were modernized with sixteen Niclausse boilers, which were water-tube models. All three ships' boilers were ducted into a single funnel just aft of the conning tower.

Armament and armor

Their main armament consisted of four  Modèle 1881 or Mle 1884, 28-caliber (cal.) guns mounted in individual barbette mounts. One was forward and one aft, both on the centerline, and two were amidships in wing mounts. Marceau received two of each model of the guns, while Neptune carried four Mle 1884 guns and Magenta mounted four of the Mle 1881 weapons. The main guns were supported by a secondary battery of sixteen  30-cal. Mle 1884 guns, all carried in individual pivot mounts in an unarmored gun battery in the hull, eight guns per broadside.

For defense against torpedo boats, the ships carried an extensive battery of light guns, though the numbers vary between sources. Gardiner reports a range of three to six  guns, nine to eighteen  3-pounder guns, eight to twelve  1-pounder five-barrel Hotchkiss revolving cannon; naval historian Eric Gille gives four to seven 65 mm guns, nine to twelve 47 mm guns, and eight 37 mm guns; naval historian Paul Silverstone says six 65 mm guns and twelve 47 mm guns. There is similar disagreement over the torpedo armament, with Gardiner providing three to five  torpedo tubes, Gille reporting five to six tubes, and Silverstone stating five tubes. According to the contemporary The Naval Annual, the ships were equipped with four tubes, two on each broadside.

The ships were protected with a combination of mild steel and compound armor that varied between each member of the class. The armor belt was backed by a layer of teak that was used to help contain the effects of a shell hit. Marceau and Neptune had compound armor belts, while Magentas was steel. Above the belt, the ships had a cofferdam that was filled with cellulose forward; this structure was intended to limit flooding in the event of damage above the waterline.

According to a contemporary British report, the magazines were not directly protected and instead relied on the side and horizontal armor for protection.

Construction

The ships of the class took around a decade to complete, far longer than should have been the case. Construction of the vessels was hampered by an inefficient system in France that lacked a centralized command structure that instead relied on separate construction and materiel organizations that shared responsibilities. Additionally, the French Navy continued to build large numbers of ships slowly, which was not a sustainable practice in a period of rapid developments in naval technology. As a result, ad hoc changes were made to ships while under construction, which further delayed their completion as outdated features had to be removed, more advanced equipment developed and installed, all the while modifying the ships' design to ensure they retained stability and did not become overloaded.

The problems with French administration were compounded with changes in leadership that brought major shifts in construction priorities. Admiral Théophile Aube, who was the Minister of Marine in 1886–1887, was a staunch advocate of the so-called  and opposed new battleship construction in favor of cheaper torpedo boats. He halted work on the ships during his tenure, which further delayed their completion.

According to the historian Theodore Ropp, "the constant tinkering with the designs...proved to be little short of disastrous", noting the dangerous instability (which afflicted Magenta in particular), their overloaded condition that largely submerged their armor belts, and their towering superstructures that rendered them large targets. Worse still, they took so long to complete that by the time they entered service, the first pre-dreadnought battleships of the  had been completed, which far surpassed the Marceaus in combat effectiveness.

Service history

After entering service, Marceau initially went on a voyage to Russia with several other vessels to mark the signing of the Franco-Russian Alliance in 1891. She then joined the Mediterranean Squadron, France's front-line fleet unit. She was joined there by the other two ships in 1893 after they were commissioned. The ships had relatively uneventful careers, and over the rest of the decade, the three ships were primarily occupied with annual training maneuvers. In 1897, Marceau and Neptune helped to evaluate a new fire-control system. Magenta was involved in tests with the new submarine  in 1898, where the submarine scored two hits with practice torpedoes. All three vessels  were reduced to training ships in 1899, as a number of new pre-dreadnought battleships had been built, taking their place as front-line warships. The Marceaus were thereafter assigned to the Reserve Division of the Mediterranean Squadron for torpedo and gunnery training.

All three ships were modernized with new boilers in the early 1900s, including reductions in their top-heavy superstructures and heavy masts and installation of water-tube boilers. Regardless, they saw limited use after returning to service. Marceau and Magenta resumed training duties in 1903, though Neptune saw no further use. During parliamentary debates in 1908, the waste of funds that had been spent modernizing Neptune was highlighted, and she was struck from the naval register either that year, or in 1913. Magenta was also struck in 1910, and Marceau became a floating workshop to support torpedo boats and submarines after the start of World War I in August 1914. She was sold to ship breakers in 1921, but while under tow from Bizerte to Toulon, she ran aground in a storm and could not be pulled free; her wreck remained visible until the 1930s.

Footnotes

References

 
 
 
 
 
 
 
 
 
 
 
 
 
 
 
 

 
Battleship classes
Ship classes of the French Navy